Mamastrovirus is a genus of viruses, in the family Astroviridae. Human, mammals, and vertebrates serve as natural hosts. There are 19 species in this genus. Diseases associated with this genus include infantile gastroenteritis.

Taxonomy
The genus contains the following species:

Mamastrovirus 1
Mamastrovirus 2
Mamastrovirus 3
Mamastrovirus 4
Mamastrovirus 5
Mamastrovirus 6
Mamastrovirus 7
Mamastrovirus 8
Mamastrovirus 9
Mamastrovirus 10
Mamastrovirus 11
Mamastrovirus 12
Mamastrovirus 13
Mamastrovirus 14
Mamastrovirus 15
Mamastrovirus 16
Mamastrovirus 17
Mamastrovirus 18
Mamastrovirus 19

Structure
Viruses in Mamastrovirus are non-enveloped, with icosahedral and spherical geometries, and T=3 symmetry. The diameter is around 35 nm. Genomes are linear and non-segmented, around 6.8-7kb in length.

Life cycle
Viral replication is cytoplasmic. Entry into the host cell is achieved by attachment to host receptors, which mediates endocytosis. Replication follows the positive stranded RNA virus replication model. Positive stranded RNA virus transcription, using an unknown model of subgenomic RNA transcription is the method of transcription. Translation takes place by -1 ribosomal frameshifting. Human, mammals, and  vertebrates serve as the natural host. Transmission routes are fecal-oral.

References

External links
 Viralzone: Mamastrovirus
 ICTV

Astroviridae
Virus genera